Arthur Edmund Coulter (May 31, 1909 – October 14, 2000) was a Canadian professional ice hockey defenceman who played for the New York Rangers and Chicago Black Hawks in the National Hockey League.

Coulter, a two time Stanley Cup Champion, helped the Black Hawks win their first championship in 1933–34 and the Rangers to a Cup win in 1939–40. He succeeded Hall of Famer Bill Cook as captain of the Rangers in 1938. He was inducted into the Hockey Hall of Fame in 1974.

Awards and achievements
Stanley Cup Championships (1934 & 1940)
NHL Second All-Star Team Defence (1935, 1938, 1939, & 1940)
Inducted into the Hockey Hall of Fame in 1974
Honoured Member of the Manitoba Hockey Hall of Fame
Member of the Manitoba Sports Hall of Fame
 In the 2009 book 100 Ranger Greats, was ranked No. 30 all-time of the 901 New York Rangers who had played during the team's first 82 seasons

Career statistics

Regular season and playoffs

References

External links

1909 births
2000 deaths
Canadian ice hockey defencemen
Canadian people of German descent
Chicago Blackhawks players
Hockey Hall of Fame inductees
New York Rangers players
Philadelphia Arrows players
Ice hockey people from Winnipeg
Stanley Cup champions
United States Coast Guard Cutters players
United States Coast Guard personnel of World War II
Winnipeg Pilgrims players
Canadian emigrants to the United States
Canadian expatriate ice hockey players in the United States